The molecular-scale temperature is the defining property of the U.S. Standard Atmosphere, 1962. It is  defined by the relationship:

 

 Tm(z) is molecular-scale temperature at altitude z;
 M0 is molecular weight of air at sea level;
 M(z) is molecular weight of air at altitude z;
 T(z) is absolute temperature at altitude z.

This is citation of the Technical Report of USAF from 1967.

References

Atmosphere
Temperature